Mandarke Madhav Pai (born 21 December 1930) is a Kannada, Sanskrit and Konkani linguist.

Early life 
Mandarke Madhav Pai was born on 21 December 1930 in Karkala, Dakshina Kannada district. He is second son of Sri M Narayan Pai & Smt Lakshmibai. He completed his primary education in Karkala board Main School & S V Higher elementary School.

Career 
Mr.Pai has written a Kannada-Konkani dictionary, which was published in both Kannada and Devanagari scripts and took five years to complete.

He also completed a Konkani translation of the vasavanas written by Basavanna, and wrote a regular linguistics column in the Konkani publication Kodial Khabar.

His contribution in the field of Konkani translation, he has been hailed as ‘Konkani Shabda Ratnakara’ (which translates to Ocean of Konkani Words). He has not only collected Konkani riddles and folklore, but also has contributed with the 750-page ‘Kannada-Konkani Dictionary’- a great service to Konkani language, indeed.

Awards and recognitions 
Mr.Pai was honored with the Basti Vaman Shenoy Seva Puraskar award at the 2014 Vimala Pai Vishwa Konkani Awards, in recognition of his "contribution to Konkani language and literature and translation".

On 22 October 2014 Mandharke Madhava Pai was awarded with the Seva puraskar for his contribution to Konkani language, old Kannada Vachana Sahithya and Konkani translation.

One of the biggest contributions to the Konkani literature was by writing Kannada - Konkani dictionary. Kannada writer Padma M Shenoy released The Kannada - Konkani dictionary written by Kannada, Sanskrit and Konkani linguist M Madhava Pai at a glittering function held at Vishwa Konkani Centre, Mangalore on Sunday 12 June.

References 

1930 births
Living people